Newman Theological College (NTC) is a Roman Catholic school of theology founded in 1969 by the Roman Catholic Archdiocese of Edmonton in Alberta, Canada.

Founding

NTC was founded in 1969 in the wake of the Second Vatican Council. NTC grew out of the existing structure of St. Joseph Seminary which had already opened its doors in 1967. NTC is a private, Catholic academic institution dedicated to the study of theology and related disciplines by people who do not intend to become priests, or who have already graduated from a seminary. Its charter to confer degrees was originally granted by the Legislative Assembly of Alberta on April 29, 1969. NTC has been an accredited member of the Association of Theological Schools in the United States and Canada since 1992.

NTC carries out its mission for the Church in an ongoing partnership with St. Joseph Seminary whose particular mission is the human, spiritual and pastoral formation of future diocesan priests. Both institutions remain distinct, interdependent, and complementary. Lay men and women, diocesan clergy from western Canada, along with several religious orders of men and consecrated women work together to fulfill the mission of NTC.

John Henry Newman

John Henry Newman (21 February 1801 – 11 August 1890) was an English theologian and poet, first an Anglican priest and later a Catholic priest and cardinal, who was an important and controversial figure in the religious history of England in the 19th century. He was known nationally by the mid-1830s, and was canonised as a saint in the Catholic Church in 2019.

History
1917
First theological faculty is set up at the Oblate Immaculate Conception Scholasticate in St. Joachim's Parish, Edmonton. Diocesan seminarians attend the scholasticate as well.
1927
Oblate Fathers move to Saskatchewan; Archdiocese of Edmonton takes over the building and calls it St. Joseph Seminary (SJS); this becomes the formation center for the diocesan seminarians.
1957
SJS moves to St. Albert where a new building is erected on vacant farmland owned by the Archdiocese.
1961
Approximately 100 students are studying for the priesthood at SJS.
1962
Vatican Council II begins.
1965
On his return from the Council Rome, Archbishop Anthony Jordan looks for ways of addressing the role of the laity in the Church. Men and women, both religious and lay, interested in theology are invited to share the facilities available in St. Albert.
1969
The theology faculty of SJS becomes Newman Theological College (NTC) by an Act of the Alberta Legislature. NTC is opened up to a larger number of lay people and religious. SJS remains on the NTC campus as a residence and house of formation for diocesan candidates to the priesthood. Seminarians now constitute one sector of the overall student body.
1970
Academic programs gradually develop. In 1972, associate status is granted to the NTC by the Association of Theological Schools.
1980
The trend continues for lay and religious to study theology. Enrolment is on the rise.
1988
The ATS grants the status of candidacy to the NTC.
1988-1991
Self-study for accreditation pursued.
1991
ATS visitation and granting of accreditation. Self-study was submitted by NTC and accepted by the ATS. An accreditation team visited NTC and made its recommendation regarding full membership to the Association.
The Summer School in Liturgical Studies was established.
1992
NTC is granted full accreditation for the Master of Divinity and Master of Theology by the ATS.
1993
NTC continued as a corporate body by an Act of Continuance of the Legislative Assembly of Alberta.
The Master of Religious Education program was accredited by the ATS.
The Foundation of Newman Theological College and St. Joseph Seminary was established.
1994
NTC celebrated its 25th anniversary. It was affirmed in its identity and mission by a canonical visitation to SJS.
1996
Self-study was submitted by NTC and accepted by the ATS. An accreditation team visited NTC and made its recommendation regarding renewal of membership to the Association.
1997
NTC is granted full accreditation for a ten-year period by the ATS.
1998
A new seminary residence and library facility are constructed on the campus.
1999
NTC/SJS celebrated the official opening of the new Sopchyshyn Family Library and Seminary Residence.
2001
NTC celebrates the 200th anniversary of the birth of the Venerable John Henry Cardinal Newman with special presentations about NTC's namesake.
2002
SJS celebrates its 75th anniversary with a three-day celebration, highlighted by an Apostolic Visitation from Rome.
2004
The NTC Academic Senate establishes the annual Kevin Carr Christian Leadership Award. The annual award recognizes and honours an individual whose outstanding Christian leadership in western and northern Canada reflects the values of NTC and the qualities that Kevin Carr cherished and exhibited in his work as NTC's seventh president (1993-2001).

2007
The Province of Alberta purchases the land of NTC/SJS in order to facilitate the completion of the Anthony Henday Drive. NTC/SJS must vacate the land by the end of June 2009.
The Most Rev. Richard Smith, Archbishop of Edmonton announces the NTC/SJS will relocate to the Edmonton Archdiocese property.
2009
NTC and SJS move to temporary locations in Sherwood Park and Ottewell, Edmonton. The Cornerstone of Faith campaign starts raising the funds for new construction. The new campus of NTC will feature state-of-the-art teaching, learning and research technology thanks to a $4.18-million grant from the federal government's Knowledge Infrastructure Program. The grant represents the first government support the college has received in its 40-year history and will help finance technology infrastructure for the Sopchyshyn Family Library and Learning Commons, classrooms and research support areas.
2010
Archbishop Richard Smith blesses the new buildings of NTC and SJS on the banks of the North Saskatchewan River in the heart of Edmonton.
2011
Classes officially begin at the present site for the first time.

Accreditation
NTC is considered a non-affiliated private college within the post-secondary educational system of Alberta. It has been empowered to confer academic degrees, diplomas and certificates in the field of religious sciences. The charter was granted on April 29, 1969, during the second session of the 16th Legislature (Private Bill #4).
In 1972, NTC became an associate member of the ATS in the United States and Canada. In 1988, NTC was granted the status of candidacy in view of a self-study and ATS visitation. Initial accreditation as a member of ATS was granted in January 1992. Accreditation was extended in 1996 and again in 2007 with approval of the following degrees:
Master of Divinity
Master of Religious Education
Master of Theological Studies and Master of Theology

Presidents
Rev. Oswald Fuchs, OFM 1969 – 1970
Rev. Michael O’ Callaghan 1970 – 1973 and 1975 – 1976
Rev. Dr. Don MacDonald, OFM 1973 – 1975, 1976 – 1978 and 1991 – 1993
Rev. Michael McCaffery 1978 – 1983
Rev. Wilfred Murchland 1983 – 1990
Most Rev. Gerald Wiesner, OMI 1992
Kevin Carr 1993 – 2001
Dr. Christophe Poworowski 2001 – 2003
Rev. Jack Gallagher, CSB 2003 – 2005
Dr. Bryn Kulmatycki 2005 – 2010
Rev. Shayne Craig 2010 – 2012
Most Rev. Paul Terrio 2012
Dr. Jason West 2012 – Present

References

Catholic universities and colleges in Canada
Universities and colleges in Edmonton
Seminaries and theological colleges in Canada
1917 establishments in Alberta
Educational institutions established in 1917
Private universities and colleges in Canada
Catholic Church in Alberta